Louise Riddell-Williams was an American tennis player of the start of the 20th century. 

She won the U.S. National Championship three times, in women's doubles with Mary Kendall Browne, in 1913, 1914 and 1921.

Grand Slam finals

Doubles (3 titles)

American female tennis players
Year of death missing
Year of birth missing
Grand Slam (tennis) champions in women's doubles
United States National champions (tennis)